Peter Gabriel is the fourth studio album by the English rock musician Peter Gabriel. In the United States and Canada, the album was released by Geffen Records with the title Security. Some music streaming services refer to it as Peter Gabriel 4: Security. A German-language version, entitled Deutsches Album (German Album), was also released. The album saw Gabriel expanding on the post-punk and world music influences from his 1980 self-titled record, and earned him his first US top 40 single with "Shock the Monkey".

Songs 
The songs of this album cover a wide variety of subject matter. "The Rhythm of the Heat" is based on Carl Jung's experience while observing a group of African drummers. "San Jacinto" reflects on the fear and pain experienced by an Indigenous American man who sees his culture overwhelmed by modern white society, its lyrics based on a story told to Gabriel by an Apache member. "Shock the Monkey", a meditation on jealousy, uses imagery of a primate to describe personal anxieties. "Lay Your Hands on Me" deals with a theme of healing, through trust, which is further explored on later albums. "The Family and the Fishing Net" is a song comparing a modern-day wedding with a voodoo sacrifice. "Wallflower" is about the treatment of political prisoners in Latin America during the 1980s.

Larry Fast, who played synthesizer, mentioned during a presentation on Moog synthesizers that the working title for "The Rhythm of the Heat" was "Jung in Africa", the working title for "Shock the Monkey" was "Black Bush", and the working title for "Lay Your Hands on Me" was "93" – this was the number of the Linn LM-1 pattern used on the track.

In The South Bank Shows documentary of the album's recording, the working title for "I Have the Touch" was shown to be "Hands".

Gabriel discussed several of the songs in an interview with DJ Alan Freeman:
"The Family and the Fishing Net": "It's basically a wedding song, but it's more an approach from the undercurrents of the wedding ritual. There are quite a lot of situations that we accept as perfectly normal and regular, traditional, that have this element of ritual that makes deep impressions on the psyche. And this is a somewhat impressionistic account of a wedding. I'd also been reading quite a lot of Dylan Thomas at the time, so there is that influence in the lyric writing."
"Lay Your Hands on Me": "It is part [hymn] and part the sort of faith healing aspect, which I think occurs in that and in 'Kiss of Life' too… I'm convinced that we have abilities within ourselves that are not really acknowledged yet. There's also the fairly dry, urban images in the verses, and then there's the sense of cleansing through this laying-on of hands. There's the screaming for the hands to be laid on in the choruses."
"Wallflower": "'Wallflower' began almost as a love song. In fact, that's probably the oldest of the songs. I started doing a version of it on the third album, which was never finished. And then I rerecorded it for this one. The Amnesty programme that they were running on the television (possibly The Secret Policeman's Ball) made quite a big dent on me as a prisoner of conscience situation. And I thought that the emotion that's in the song could be usefully directed with that sort of lyric. So, after a certain amount of soul-searching, I decided to go for it on this album. And it feels real to me, so I'm quite pleased with it."

 Recording 
It was recorded at Gabriel's then-home, Ashcombe House in Somerset, England in 1981. The album was an early example of digital recording, having been mixed to a Sony PCM-1610 digital 2-track. The songs contain many unique sounds from the revolutionary Synthesizer/Digital Sampler Fairlight CMI. The first two weeks of recordings involved use of the Mobile One, a London-based recording truck which offered 46-track recording facilities.

The album was remastered with most of Gabriel's catalogue in 2002.

 Title 

As with his previous three albums, the album is titled Peter Gabriel. In the United States and Canada Geffen Records issued the album under the title Security to differentiate it from his previous releases. The title was changed with Gabriel's reluctant agreement. The new title was displayed in a sticker on top of the LP sleeve's shrink-wrap and on the disc labels. Whilst Gabriel provided the title himself, the album was officially known as Peter Gabriel in other territories. The Security title was maintained on American and Canadian releases of the album until 2010, when it reverted to the original Peter Gabriel title for reissues by Gabriel's own Real World Records label.

 Alternative versions 
Five songs from the album – "The Rhythm of the Heat", "San Jacinto", "The Family and the Fishing Net", "I Have the Touch", and "Shock the Monkey" – are included among the live performances on Gabriel's double album Plays Live (1983).

Adaptations of "The Rhythm of the Heat", "San Jacinto", and "Wallflower" were included in Gabriel's soundtrack for the 1984 film Birdy.

Alternative metal band Primus covered "The Family and the Fishing Net" on their 1998 EP Rhinoplasty.

 In other media 
"The Rhythm of the Heat" appears in the opening scene of "Evan", an episode aired during the first season of Miami Vice. Gabriel, who had seven songs used, had the most songs featured by a solo artist in the series. He is also the only artist to have had a song used in four of the show's five seasons. (None of his songs were used in the second season, though "Take Me Home" by Phil Collins, which features backing vocals by Gabriel, was used in the second-season premiere.) The song was also used in the feature film Natural Born Killers, and in the commercials for the 2001 film Pearl Harbor.

"Shock the Monkey" was featured on the 1987 film Project X (starring Matthew Broderick and Helen Hunt). The song was referenced in the 1988, Season 6, Episode 17 of the American sitcom Cheers. Lillith says she will never be able to hear "Shock the Monkey" again without crying. The song also appeared in the South Park episode "Raisins".

"I Have the Touch" featured in the 1988 film The Chocolate War. An alternate version of the track was featured on the 1996 film Phenomenon, starring John Travolta. A cover version by Heather Nova was featured in The Craft.

"Lay Your Hands on Me" appears in "Crossbreed", a fifth season episode of The Americans. It is the third appearance of a Gabriel song in the series, the first being "Games Without Frontiers" in the season one finale, "The Colonel", and the second being "Here Comes the Flood" in the third episode of season two, "The Walk In."

 Track listing 

 Personnel 
 Peter Gabriel – vocals, programming and sequencing (tracks 1–6), synthesizer, piano (track 7), surdo (tracks 1, 8), additional drums on track 2
 Tony Levin – bass guitar (tracks 1, 6–8), Chapman stick (tracks 2–5)
 David Rhodes – guitar (tracks 2–8)
 Jerry Marotta – drum kit, surdo (track 1), percussion (track 6)
 Larry Fast – synthesizer (tracks 1–5, 7, 8), electronic percussion (track 8)
 John Ellis – backing vocals on tracks 1, 3, 8, guitar on tracks 2, 4
 Roberto Laneri – treated saxophone on track 4
 Morris Pert – timbales on track 6, percussion on track 8
 Stephen Paine – programming on track 4
 David Lord – synthesizer on tracks 6, 7, piano on tracks 7, 8
 Peter Hammill – backing vocals on tracks 4, 5, 6
 Jill Gabriel – backing vocals on track 2
 Ekome Dance Company – Ghanaian drums on track 1
 Greg Fulginiti – mastering
 Malcolm Poynter – album art Production Peter Gabriel - producer
 David Lord - producer, engineer
 Neil Perry - assistant engineer
 Andy Rose - engineer (Mobile One)
 Tim Wybrow - engineer (Mobile One)
 Julian Mendelsohn - remix on track 5
 Danny Heaps - remix assistant on track 5

 Charts AlbumWeekly chartsSingles'''

Certifications

 Deutsches Album Deutsches Album (1982) is Gabriel's German-language adaptation of his fourth album. It was released simultaneously with the English-language edition in Germany.

Like Gabriel's previous German-language album, Ein deutsches Album (1980), Deutsches Album'' differs from its English-language release in several ways. The album boasts a different running order: "San Jacinto" is swapped with "The Family and the Fishing Net" (here, "Das Fischernetz"). Some of the songs are substantially remixed and are, for instance, 15–30 seconds longer or shorter than their international versions. Track eight gains a final coda not found on the English version, while track seven has an earlier instrumental fade. The background vocals are redone in German. In the third track, a shouted nonsense refrain has been added.

Track listing

Side One
"Der Rhythmus der Hitze" – 5:36
"Das Fischernetz" – 6:45
"Kon Takt!" – 4:31
"San Jacinto" – 6:13

Side two
"Schock den Affen" – 5:43
"Handauflegen" – 6:02
"Nicht die Erde hat dich verschluckt" – 5:59
"Mundzumundbeatmung" – 4:54

References

External links 
 
 

1982 albums
Peter Gabriel albums
Albums produced by Peter Gabriel
Charisma Records albums
Geffen Records albums
Worldbeat albums